South Chamorro Seamount is a large serpentinite mud volcano and seamount located in the Izu–Bonin–Mariana Arc, one of 16 such volcanoes in the arc. Studies of the seamount include dives by the submersible dives (DSV Shinkai, 1993 and 1997), drilling (Ocean Drilling Program, 2001) and (International Ocean Discovery Program, 2016–2017), and ROV dives (2003, 2009).

The seamount and its nearby peers were created by the movement of crushed rock, resulting from plate movement, upwards through fissures in the Mariana Plate. The seamount suffered a major flank collapse on its southeastern side, over which the present summit was probably formed. The summit supports an ecosystem of mussels, gastropods, tube worms, and others, suggesting that it is an active seeping region.

Geology

Origin and geochemistry 
South Chamorro Seamount and the other mud volcanoes formed as a result of the subduction of the Pacific Plate below the Mariana Plate; fault lines in the Mariana Plate provide a gateway for churned up rock and fluid from the grinding process up to the ocean surface. Reactions with the overlying mantle produce serpentinite, hydrogen gas, and other alkaline substances.

Because of its distance from the trench, its eruptive fluids are hotter (over ), less alkalic, and with more calcium. Its flows have a pH of 12.2 (highly basic) and are sulfate and methane rich.

Serpentine mud volcanoes are currently limited to the Izu-Bonin-Mariana arc; however, there is evidence of the geological remnants of similar volcanics globally, throughout Earth's history.

Structure 
Side-scan surveys of South Chamorro Seamount show a major southeastern sector edifice collapse, with debris flows of serpentine material (dredged in 1981 and observed by submersibles in 1995) that blankets the slope of the trench from summit to axis. The true summit of the volcano sits above this collapse; its formation was likely tied to the collapse. Submarine observation of the summit show that the summit knoll is broken up into slabs of serpentine mud, with meter-deep fissures arranged in a crosscutting orientation.

Ecology 
South Chamorro Seamount is host to a variety of fauna, including mussels, gastropods, tube worms, and galatheid crabs. A borehole observatory on the summit produced 20,000 litres of microbially-altered fluid per day for study. These organisms are supported by low-temperature springs from the fissures surrounding the summit zone. The mussels are probably of the genus Bathymodiolus, which require a high concentration of methane in their food source. The fluid composition and the biological community suggests that the summit region is an active cold seep region.

See also 
 Graveyard Seamounts
 Jasper Seamount
 Mud volcano
 Muirfield Seamount
 Sedlo Seamount

References 

Seamounts of the Pacific Ocean
Mud volcanoes
Philippine Sea